Di Linh is a district (huyện) of Lâm Đồng province in the Central Highlands region of Vietnam.

As of 2003 the district had a population of 154,472. The district covers an area of 1,628 km². The district capital lies at Di Linh.

References

Districts of Lâm Đồng province